Floyd Nattrass (2 January 1918 – 7 December 2004) was a Canadian sports shooter. He competed in the trap event at the 1964 Summer Olympics.

References

1918 births
2004 deaths
Canadian male sport shooters
Olympic shooters of Canada
Shooters at the 1964 Summer Olympics
Place of birth missing